All Saints' Day, also known as All Hallows' Day, the Feast of All Saints, the Feast of All Hallows, the Solemnity of All Saints, and Hallowmas, is a Christian solemnity celebrated in honour of all the saints of the church, whether they are known or unknown.

From the 4th century, feasts commemorating all Christian martyrs were held in various places, on various dates near Easter and Pentecost. In the 9th century, some churches in the British Isles began holding the commemoration of all saints on 1 November, and in the 9th century this was extended to the whole Catholic Church by Pope Gregory IV.

In Western Christianity, it is still celebrated on 1 November by the Roman Catholic Church as well as many Protestant churches, as the Lutheran, Anglican, and Methodist traditions. The Eastern Orthodox Church and associated Eastern Catholic and Eastern Lutheran churches celebrate it on the first Sunday after Pentecost. The Syro-Malabar Church and the Chaldean Catholic Church, both of whom are in communion with Rome, as well as the Church of the East celebrate All Saints' Day on the first Friday after Easter Sunday. In the Coptic Orthodox tradition, All Saints' Day is on Nayrouz, celebrated on 11 September. The day is both the start of the Coptic new year and its first month, Thout.

Liturgical celebrations
In the Western Christian practice, the liturgical celebration begins with its first Vespers on the evening of 31 October, All Hallows' Eve (All Saints' Eve), and ends at the compline of 1 November. It is thus the day before All Souls' Day, which commemorates the faithful departed. In many traditions, All Saints' Day is part of the season of Allhallowtide, which includes the three days from 31 October to 2 November inclusive, and in some denominations, such as Anglicanism, extends to Remembrance Sunday. In places where All Saints' Day is observed as a public holiday but All Souls' Day is not, cemetery and grave rituals such as offerings of flowers, candles and prayers or blessings for the graves of loved ones often take place on All Saints Day. In Austria and Germany, godparents gift their godchildren Allerheiligenstriezel (All Saint's Braid) on All Saint's Day, while the practice of souling remains popular in Portugal. It is a national holiday in many Christian countries.

The Christian celebration of All Saints' Day and All Souls' Day stems from a belief that there is a powerful spiritual bond between those in heaven (the "Church triumphant"), the living (the "Church militant"), and the "Church penitent" which includes the faithful departed. In Catholic theology, the day commemorates all those who have attained the beatific vision in Heaven. In Methodist theology, All Saints Day revolves around "giving God solemn thanks for the lives and deaths of his saints", including those who are "famous or obscure". As such, individuals throughout the Church Universal are honoured, such as Paul the Apostle, Augustine of Hippo and John Wesley, in addition to individuals who have personally led one to faith in Jesus, such as one's grandmother or friend.

Western Christianity

The holiday of All Saints' Day falls on 1 November, is followed by All Souls' Day on 2 November. It is a Solemnity in the Roman Rite of the Catholic Church, a Festival in the Lutheran Churches, and a Principal Feast of the Anglican Communion.

History
From the 4th century, there existed in certain places and at sporadic intervals a feast day to commemorate all Christian martyrs. It was held on 13 May in Edessa, the Sunday after Pentecost in Antioch, and the Friday after Easter by the Syrians. During the 5th century, St. Maximus of Turin preached annually on the Sunday after Pentecost in honor of all martyrs in what is today northern Italy. The Comes of Würzburg, the earliest existing ecclesiastical reading list, dating to the late 6th or early 7th century in what is today Germany, lists this the Sunday after Pentecost as dominica in natale sanctorum ("Sunday of the Nativity of the Saints"). By this time, the commemoration had expanded to include all saints, martyred or not.

On 13 May 609 or 610, Pope Boniface IV consecrated the Pantheon at Rome to the Blessed Virgin Mary and all the martyrs, ordering an anniversary; the feast of dedicatio Sanctae Mariae ad Martyres has been celebrated at Rome ever since. It is suggested 13 May was chosen by the Pope and earlier by Christians in Edessa because it was the date of the Roman pagan festival of Lemuria, in which malevolent and restless spirits of the dead were propitiated. Some liturgiologists base the idea that Lemuria was the origin of All Saints on their identical dates and their similar theme of "all the dead".

Pope Gregory III (731–741) dedicated an oratory in Old St. Peter's Basilica to the relics "of the holy apostles and of all saints, martyrs and confessors, of all the just made perfect who are at rest throughout the world". Some sources say Gregory III dedicated the oratory on 1 November, and this is why the date became All Saints' Day. Other sources say Gregory III held a synod to condemn iconoclasm on 1 November 731, but dedicated the All Saints oratory on Palm Sunday, 12 April 732.

By 800, there is evidence that churches in Ireland, Northumbria (England) and Bavaria (Germany) were holding a feast commemorating all saints on 1 November. Some manuscripts of the Irish Martyrology of Tallaght and Martyrology of Óengus, which date to this time, have a commemoration of all saints of the world on 1 November. In the late 790s, Alcuin of Northumbria recommended holding the feast on 1 November to his friend, Arno of Salzburg in Bavaria. Alcuin then used his influence with Charlemagne to introduce the Irish-Northumbrian Feast of All Saints to the Frankish Kingdom.

Some scholars propose that churches in the British Isles began celebrating All Saints on 1 November in the 8th century to coincide with or replace the Celtic festival known in Ireland and Scotland as Samhain. James Frazer represents this school of thought by arguing that 1 November was chosen because Samhain was the date of the Celtic festival of the dead. Ronald Hutton argues instead that the earliest documentary sources indicate Samhain was a harvest festival with no particular ritual connections to the dead. Hutton proposes that 1 November was a Germanic rather than a Celtic idea.

The 1 November All Saints Day was made a day of obligation throughout the Frankish Empire in 835, by a decree of Emperor Louis the Pious, issued "at the instance of Pope Gregory IV and with the assent of all the bishops", which confirmed its celebration on 1 November. Under the rule of Charlemagne and his successors, the Frankish Empire developed into the Holy Roman Empire.

Sicard of Cremona, a scholar who lived in the 12th and 13th centuries, proposed that Pope Gregory VII (1073–85) suppressed the feast of 13 May in favour of 1 November. By the 12th century, 13 May had been deleted from liturgical books.

The All Saints octave was added by Pope Sixtus IV (1471–84). Both the All Saints vigil and the octave were suppressed by the Liturgical reforms of Pope Pius XII in 1955.

Protestant observances
The festival was retained after the Reformation in the liturgical calendars of the Lutheran Churches and the Anglican Church. In the Lutheran churches, such as the Church of Sweden, it assumes a role of general commemoration of the dead. In the Swedish calendar, the observance takes place on the Saturday between 31 October and 6 November. In many Lutheran Churches, it is moved to the first Sunday of November. In the Church of England, mother church of the Anglican Communion, it is a Principal Feast and may be celebrated either on 1 November or on the Sunday between 30 October and 5 November. It is also celebrated by other Protestants, such as the United Church of Canada and various Methodist connexions.

Protestants generally commemorate all Christians, living and deceased, on All Saints' Day; if they observe All Saints Day at all, they use it to remember all Christians both past and present. In the United Methodist Church, All Saints' Day is celebrated on the first Sunday in November. It is held, not only to remember Saints, but also to remember all those who have died who were members of the local church congregation. In some congregations, a candle is lit by the Acolyte as each person's name is called out by the clergy. Prayers and responsive readings may accompany the event. Often, the names of those who have died in the past year are affixed to a memorial plaque.

In many Lutheran churches, All Saints' Day is celebrated the Sunday after Reformation is celebrated (the date for Reformation is 31 October, so Reformation Sunday is celebrated on or before 31 October). In most congregations, the festival is marked as an occasion to remember the dead. The names of those who have died from the congregation within the last year are read during worship and a bell is tolled, a chime is played or a candle is lit for each name read. While the dead are solemnly remembered during worship on All Saints' Sunday, the festival is ultimately a celebration of Christ's victory over death.

In English-speaking countries, services often include the singing of the traditional hymn "For All the Saints" by Walsham How. The most familiar tune for this hymn is Sine Nomine by Ralph Vaughan Williams. Other hymns that are popularly sung during corporate worship on this day are "I Sing a Song of the Saints of God" and "Ye Watchers and Ye Holy Ones".

Halloween celebrations

Being the vigil of All Saints' Day (All Hallows' Day), in many countries, such as Ireland, the United Kingdom, the United States and Canada, Halloween is celebrated on 31 October. During the 20th century the observance largely became a secular one, although some traditional Christian groups have continued to embrace the Christian origins of Halloween whereas others have rejected such celebrations.

Eastern Christianity

The Eastern Orthodox Church, following the Byzantine tradition, commemorates all saints collectively on the Sunday after Pentecost, All Saints' Sunday (Greek: Ἁγίων Πάντων, Agiōn Pantōn).

By 411, the East Syrians kept the Chaldean Calendar with a "Commemoratio Confessorum" celebrated on the Friday after Easter. The 74th homily of St. John Chrysostom from the late 4th or early 5th century marks the observance of a feast of all the martyrs on the first Sunday after Pentecost. Some scholars place the location where this sermon was delivered as Constantinople.

The Feast of All Saints achieved greater prominence in the 9th century, in the reign of the Byzantine Emperor Leo VI "the Wise" (866–911). His wife, Empress Theophano lived a devout life and, after her death, miracles occurred. Her husband built a church for her relics and intended to name it to her. He was discouraged to do so by local bishops, and instead dedicated it to "All Saints". According to tradition, it was Leo who expanded the feast from a commemoration of All Martyrs to a general commemoration of All Saints, whether martyrs or not.

This Sunday marks the close of the Paschal season. To the normal Sunday services are added special scriptural readings and hymns to all the saints (known and unknown) from the Pentecostarion.

In the late spring, the Sunday following Pentecost Saturday (50 days after Easter) is set aside as a commemoration of all locally venerated saints, such as "All Saints of America", "All Saints of Mount Athos", etc. The third Sunday after Pentecost may be observed for even more localised saints, such as "All Saints of St. Petersburg", or for saints of a particular type, such as "New Martyrs of the Turkish Yoke".

In addition to the Mondays mentioned above, Saturdays throughout the year are days for general commemoration of all saints, and special hymns to all saints are chanted from the Octoechos.

Lebanon
The celebration of 1 November in Lebanon as a holiday reflects the influence of Western Catholic orders present in Lebanon and is not Maronite in origin. The traditional Maronite feast equivalent to the honor of all saints in their liturgical calendar is one of three Sundays in preparation for Lent called the Sunday of the Righteous and the Just. The following Sunday is the Sunday of the Faithful Departed (similar to All Souls' Day in Western calendar).

East Syriac tradition
In East Syriac tradition the All Saints Day celebration falls on the first Friday after resurrection Sunday. This is because all departed faithful are saved by the blood of Jesus and they resurrected with the Christ. Normally in east Syriac liturgy the departed souls are remembered on Friday. Church celebrates All souls' day on Friday before the beginning of Great lent or Great Fast.

Customs

Europe

Austria and Bavaria
In Austria and Bavaria it is customary on All Saints' Day for godfathers to give their godchildren Allerheiligenstriezel, a braided yeast pastry.

Belgium
In Belgium, Toussaint or Allerheiligen is a public holiday. Belgians visit the cemeteries to place chrysanthemums on the graves of deceased relatives on All Saints Day, since All Souls' Day is not a holiday.

France
In France, and throughout the Francophone world, the day is known as La Toussaint. Flowers (especially chrysanthemums), or wreaths called couronnes de toussaints, are placed at each tomb or grave. The following day, 2 November (All Souls' Day) is called Le jour des morts, the Day of the Dead. November 1st is a public holiday.

Germany
In Germany, Allerheiligen is a public holiday in five federal states, namely Baden-Württemberg, Bayern, Rheinland-Pfalz, Nordrhein-Westfalen and Saarland. They categorize it as a silent day (stiller Tag) when public entertainment events are only permitted if the serious character of the day is preserved.

Hungary

In Hungary, Mindenszentek napja (literally All Saints Day) is a national holiday which is followed by Halottak napja (Day of the Dead). On Day of the Dead people take candles and flowers (especially chrysanthemums) on the tombs or graves of all their loved ones and relatives thus many people travell around the country to distant cemeteries. People who cannot travell may lay their flowers or candles at the main calvary cross of a nearby cemetery. Since only All Saints Day is a national holiday, most people use this day to visit cemeteries and pay tribute to their passed relatives. As in the case with every national holiday in Hungary if All Saints Day happens to be a Tuesday or a Thursday then that week's Monday or Friday is observed as a Saturday making that weekend 4 days long and one of the previous or following Saturdays is changed to a workday. Traffic in and around cemeteries are much higher than usual on these days with actual police presence.

Poland
In Poland, Dzień Wszystkich Świętych is a public holiday. Families try to gather together for both All Saints' Day and the All Souls' Day (Zaduszki), the official day to commemorate the departed faithful. The celebrations begin with tending to family graves and the surrounding graveyards, lighting candles and leaving flowers. 1 November is a bank holiday in Poland, while the following All Souls' Day is not. The Zaduszki custom of honouring the dead thus corresponds with All Souls' Day celebrations, and is much more observed in Poland than in most other places in the West.

Portugal
In Portugal, Dia de Todos os Santos is a national holiday. Families remember their dead with religious observances and visits to the cemetery. Portuguese children celebrate the Pão-por-Deus tradition (also called santorinho, bolinho or fiéis de Deus) going door-to-door, where they receive cakes, nuts, pomegranates, sweets and candies.

Spain
In Spain, el Día de Todos los Santos is a national holiday. People take flowers to the graves of dead relatives. The play Don Juan Tenorio is traditionally performed.

Americas

Guatemala

In Guatemala, All Saints' Day is a national holiday. On that day Guatemalans make a special meal called fiambre which is made of cold meats and vegetables; it is customary to visit cemeteries and to leave some of the fiambre for their dead. It is also customary to fly kites to help unite the dead with the living. There are festivals in towns like Santiago Sacatepéquez and Sumpango, where giant colorful kites are flown.

Mexico
All Saints' Day in Mexico coincides with the first day of the Day of the Dead (Día de Muertos) celebration. It commemorates children who have died (Dia de los Inocentes) and the second day celebrates all deceased adults.

Philippines
Allhowtide in the Philippines is variously called "Undás" (from the Spanish Honras, meaning honours, as in "with honours"), "Todos los Santos" (Spanish, "All Saints"), and sometimes "Araw ng mga Patay / Yumao" (Tagalog, "Day of the Dead/Passed Away"), which incorporates All Saints' Day and All Souls' Day. Filipinos traditionally observe this day by visiting their family's graves to clean and repair the tombs. Prayers for the dead are recited, while offerings are made, the most common being flowers, candles, food, and for Chinese Filipinos, incense and kim. Many also spend the day and ensuing night holding reunions at the graves with feasting and merriment.

Pangangaluluwa and Trick-or-treat
Though Halloween is usually seen as an American influence, the country's trick-or-treat traditions during Undas are actually much older. This tradition was derived from the pre-colonial tradition of pangangaluwa. From "káluluwâ" ("spirit double"), it was a practice of early Filipinos, swathed in blankets, going from house to house, and singing as they pretended to be the spirits of ancestors. If the owner of the house failed to give biko or rice cakes to the "nangángalúluwâ", the "spirits" would play tricks (such as stealing slippers or other objects left outside the house, or run off with the family's chickens). Pangángaluluwâ practices are still seen in some rural areas.

Cemetery and reunion practices
During Undas, families visit the graves of loved ones. It is believed that by going to the cemetery and offering food, candles, flowers, and sometimes incense, the spirits are remembered and appeased. Contrary to common belief, this visitation practice is not an imported tradition. Prior to the use of coffins, pre-colonial Filipinos were already visiting burial caves throughout the archipelago as confirmed by research conducted by the University of the Philippines. The tradition of atang or hain is also practiced, where food and other offerings are placed at the gravesite. If the family cannot visit, a specific area in the house is set aside for ritual offerings.

The present date of Undas, 1 November, is not a pre-colonial observance but an import from Mexico, where it is known as the Day of the Dead. Pre-colonial Filipinos preferred going to the burial caves of the departed occasionally as they believed that aswáng (monster, half-vampire, half-werewolf beings) would take the corpse of the dead if it was not properly guarded. Watching over the body of the dead is called "paglalamay". However, in some communities, this paglalamay tradition is non-existent and is replaced by other pre-colonial traditions unique to each community.

Undas is also seen as a family holiday, where members living elsewhere to their hometowns to visit ancestral graves. Family members are expected to remain beside the grave for the entire day and socialize with each other to strengthen ties. In some cases, family members going to graves may exceed one hundred people. Fighting in any form is taboo during Undas.

Role of children
Children are allowed to play with melted candles left at tombs, which they form into wax balls. The round balls symbolize the affirmation that everything goes back to where it began, as the living will return to dust from whence it came. In some cases, families also light candles by the front door, their number equivalent to the number of departed loved ones. It is believed that the lights aid the spirits and guide them to the afterlife.

Holidays
1 November is a fixed date public holiday in Andorra, Austria, Belgium, Benin, Burkina Faso, Burundi, Cape Verde, Central African Republic, Chad, Chile, Colombia, Congo, Croatia, East Timor, France, French Guiana, French Polynesia, Gabon, Guadeloupe, Guatemala, Hungary, Italy, Ivory Coast, Lebanon, Liechtenstein, Lithuania, Luxembourg, Madagascar, Martinique, Peru, Poland, Portugal, Saint Barthélemy, Saint Martin, Saint Pierre and Miquelon, San Marino, Senegal, Seychelles, Slovakia, Slovenia, Spain, Togo, the Vatican and Venezuela.

In Belgium, all Sundays are public holidays; should All Saints fall on a Sunday, then a replacement day on a weekday of choice is given. In Monaco, if it falls on a Sunday, the next day is a statutory holiday.

In Sweden, an All Saints public holiday falls on the Saturday during the period between 31 October and 6 November, with a half-holiday the day before. Both in Finland and Estonia, the All Saints public holiday was moved from a fixed date of 1 November to a public holiday on the Saturday during the period between 31 October and 6 November. In the Åland Islands the first Saturday of November is an All Saints public holiday.

In Montenegro, All Saints' Day is considered a Roman Catholic holiday and is a non-working day for that religious community. In Bosnia and Herzegovina it's a public holiday in the Federation of Bosnia and Herzegovina only.

In Germany All Saints' is a designated quiet day in states of Baden-Württemberg, Bavaria, North Rhine-Westphalia, Rhineland-Palatinate and Saarland. Similarly in Switzerland the following 15 out of 26 cantons have All Saints as a public holiday: Aargau, Appenzell Innerrhoden, Fribourg, Glarus, Jura, Luzern, Nidwalden, Obwalden, Saint Gallen, Solothurn, Schwyz, Ticino, Uri, Valais, and Zug.

Although the European Commission does not set public holidays for its member states, 1 November is a public holiday for the employees of the institutions of the European Union.

In the Philippines, where there are two types of public holidays, All Saints' Day is a fixed date, special holiday.

In India, All Saints Day is considered a public holiday in the state of Karnataka and a Christian religious holiday throughout the country, which means it is often a common addition to the list of paid holidays at the discretion of the employer, for those that wish to observe. It also happens to coincide with several state foundation days that fall on 1 November in several states: Karnataka Rajyotsava in Karnataka, Andhra Pradesh Day in Andhra Pradesh, Haryana Foundation Day in Haryana, Madhya Pradesh Foundation Day in Madhya Pradesh, Kerala Foundation Day in Kerala and the Chhattisgarh Foundation Day in Chhattisgarh.

In Bolivia All Saints is a public holiday on 2 November, unlike most other countries which celebrate All Souls' Day on that date.

In Antigua and Barbuda, 1 November falls on Independence Day, in Algeria on Revolution Day and in the US Virgin Islands on Liberty Day.

See also

 1755 Lisbon earthquake which occurred on this day and had a great effect on society and philosophy
 Dziady
 Irish calendar
 Litany of the Saints
 Veneration of the dead

Notes

References

Citations

Bibliography

Further reading
 Langgärtner, Georg. "All Saints' Day". In The Encyclopedia of Christianity, edited by Erwin Fahlbusch and Geoffrey William Bromiley, 41. Vol. 1. Grand Rapids: Wm. B. Eerdmans, 1999. .

External links

 All Saints and All Souls Day American Catholic
 All Saints Sunday Orthodox England
 A Vigil service for All Saints All Hallows' E'en – "Halloween"
 First Sunday after Pentecost, or All Saints Sunday by Sergei Bulgakov, Handbook for Church Servers
 Synaxis of All Saints Icon and Synaxarion of the feast

Allhallowtide
Christian saints
November observances
Observances honoring the dead
Public holidays in Croatia